Al-Shafii was a Muslim jurist and founder of the Shafii school of fiqh (or Madh'hab) which is named after him.

Al-Shafii may also refer to:
 Al-Ghazali
 Al-Nawawi

See also
 Hanbali (nisba) (disambiguation)